Bannerman is a name of Scottish origin (see Clan Bannerman) and may refer to

Places
Canada
 Bannerman, Edmonton, a neighbourhood in Edmonton, Canada
United States
 Bannerman, Wisconsin, an unincorporated community
 Bannerman's Castle, an abandoned arms depot on the Hudson River in New York

Other uses
 The carrier of a military unit's colours, standards and guidons, or other banners
 Bannerman (surname)
 Bannerman, a San Francisco-based, technology enabled, security guard company.
 Bannerman, a loose translation of hatamoto, a direct vassal of the Tokugawa shogunate in Japan
 A man who belonged to the Eight Banners of the Qing Dynasty
 An alternative name of Manchu people
 The surname of some key characters in the Stephen King novel The Dead Zone and related works
 The Banner Man, a 1971 single by Blue Mink, charting at #3 in the United Kingdom
 Bannerman, a track on Squint (album), by Steve Taylor

See also
 Clan Bannerman
 Bannerman baronets
 Bannerman Clarke
 Pollepel Island (also Bannerman Island), site of Bannerman's Castle
 Delta and the Bannermen

Occupational surnames